The 2012 African Badminton Championships or Africa Senior Championships were held in Addis Ababa, Ethiopia between 26-28 February and organised by the Badminton Confederation of Africa.

Medalists

Medal table

References

External links 
 Result

African Badminton Championships
2012 in African sport
Badminton tournaments in Ethiopia
African Badminton Championships
February 2012 sports events in Africa